Mahmut Selim Imamoglu (born 23 January 1991) is an Austrian footballer.

References

1991 births
Living people
Austrian people of Turkish descent
Association football defenders
Austrian footballers
Austrian Football Bundesliga players
First Vienna FC players
SC Wiener Neustadt players